Francis Riley Heakes (1858 - 1930) was a Canadian architect. He studied under Kivas Tully in the mid-1880s.

Heakes was born in Toronto to British immigrants Samuel Heakes and Elizabeth Isabella Riley.

He was at one time Chief Architect of the Public Works Department of the Province of Ontario. The Ontario Archives hold drawings for virtually all provincial buildings including courthouses, registry offices, gaols & lockups, schools and colleges, hospitals and other works executed under his supervision from 1896 until 1926.

Among his important commissions were the Whitney Block in downtown Toronto, the Mining Building at the University of Toronto (1905), and the Superior Court of Justice in Thunder Bay (1924). Perhaps his most famous commission was Government House in Toronto (Chorley Park), designed in a style reminiscent of French châteaux. It was one of the most expensive residences ever constructed in Canada at the time (1915), and was more impressive than even Rideau Hall in size and grandeur. The building was demolished in 1961.

Other notable projects involving Heakes:

 Osgoode Hall West Wing addition 1908 and North Wing 1910-1912
 Lakeshore Psychiatric Hospital Chapel and Assembly Hall 1896 and Fire Hall 1919
 Ontario Agricultural College, Guelph, Ontario various buildings from 1896 to 1929

See also

Other Ontario provincial architects included:

 Kivas Tully
 George A. White
 George N. Williams

References

 Tully reference
 Mining Building
 Superior Court of Justice
 Chorely Park
 Dictionary of Architects in Canada Francis R. Heakes 

1858 births
1930 deaths
Canadian architects